Snowornis is a genus of birds in the family Cotingidae. The species were formerly included in the genus Lipaugus, 

The genus Snowornis was introduced in 2001 by Richard Prum with the grey-tailed piha as the type species. The name was chosen to honour the ornithologist David W. Snow. His name is combined with the Ancient Greek ornis meaning "bird". The genus is sister to the genus Carpornis  which contains the two berryeaters. 

The genus contains two species.

References

 
Bird genera
Taxonomy articles created by Polbot